The 2013–14 UCF Knights men's basketball team represented the University of Central Florida during the 2013–14 NCAA Division I men's basketball season. The Knights competed in Division I of the National Collegiate Athletic Association (NCAA) in the American Athletic Conference (The American). The Knights, in the program's 45th season of basketball, were led by fourth-year head coach Donnie Jones, and played their home games at the CFE Arena on the university's main campus in Orlando, Florida.

The season is UCF's first as a member of The American. UCF played in Conference USA from 2005 to 2013.

They finished the season 13–18, 4–14 in AAC play to finish in a tie for eighth place. They advanced to the quarterfinals of the AAC tournament where they lost to Cincinnati.

Previous season
In the previous year, the Knights finished the season 20–11, 9–7 in C-USA play tie for fourth place. Due to NCAA sanctions, UCF was ineligible for the 2013 Conference USA men's basketball tournament or a post-season berth.

Roster

Schedule and results

|-
!colspan=9 style="background:#000000; color:#BC9B6A;"| Non-Conference Regular Season

|-
!colspan=9 style="background:#000000; color:#BC9B6A;"| American Regular Season

|-
!colspan=9 style="background:#000000; color:#BC9B6A;"| American Athletic Conference tournament

References

UCF Knights men's basketball seasons
UCF
UCF Knights
UCF Knights